Barbara and the Camp Dogs is a rock musical by Ursula Yovich and Alana Valentine with songs by Valentine, Yovich and Adm Ventoura. The work concerns Barbara, an Aboriginal pub singer trying to make it in Sydney, and her cousin and foster sister René. When the health of Barbara's mother deteriorates, they embark on a pilgrimage back home to country in the Northern Territory.

Productions 
Barbara and the Camp Dogs premiered at the Belvoir St Theatre, Sydney in December 2017, featuring Yovich (Barbara) and Elaine Crombie (René). The production was directed by Leticia Cáceres and produced by Belvoir in association with Vicki Gordon Music Productions. Its national tour in 2019 played in Melbourne, Sydney, Brisbane, Canberra and Wollongong.

Awards 
It received four 2019 Helpmann Awards including Best Musical and Best Original Score. The work was also nominated for the AWGIE Award for Music Theatre in 2018, and was shortlisted in 2019 for both the New South Wales Premier's Literary Awards' Nick Enright Prize for Playwriting and the Victorian Premier's Literary Awards' Prize for Drama.

References 

2017 musicals
Australian musicals
Indigenous Australian theatre